Milan Šimčák (born 23 August 1995) is a Slovak footballer who plays for Slovenian PrvaLiga side Koper as a left-back.

Club career
With Zemplín Michalovce, Šimčák won the 2014–15 Slovak Second League. He made his Slovak Super Liga debut for Zemplín against AS Trenčín on 18 July 2015.

References

External links
Futbalnet profile 

1995 births
Living people
Sportspeople from Košice
Slovak footballers
Association football fullbacks
MFK Zemplín Michalovce players
FC Lokomotíva Košice players
FC DAC 1904 Dunajská Streda players
FC ŠTK 1914 Šamorín players
FK Senica players
FK Pohronie players
FC Koper players
2. Liga (Slovakia) players
Slovak Super Liga players
Slovenian PrvaLiga players
Slovak expatriate footballers
Slovak expatriate sportspeople in Slovenia
Expatriate footballers in Slovenia